Jean Goulin (10 January 1728 – 30 April 1799) was an 18th-century French physician.

Sources 

 Pierre Sue, Mémoire historique, littéraire et critique sur la vie et les ouvrages tant imprimés que manuscrits de Jean Goulin, Éditions Paris, Blanchon, 1800
 Huguet (F.) Les professeurs de la Faculté de médecine de Paris, dictionnaire biographique, 1794–1939.- Paris, 1991 (cote : 262917)
 Nicolas-Toussaint des Essarts, Les siècles littéraires de la France, ou Nouveau dictionnaire de tous les écrivains français

External links 
 Biographie de Jean Goulin (1728-1799)
 Dictionnaire des journalistes (1600-1789)
 Fiche biographique de la bibliothèque de médecine de Paris (Biusanté)

1728 births
1799 deaths
People from Reims
18th-century French physicians